Luis Miguel Acevedo Tabárez (born 5 October 1996) is a Uruguayan professional footballer who plays as a forward for Uruguayan Primera División club Rentistas.

Career 
On 7 February 2019, Acevedo joined Peñarol on a one-year contract with a possibility of extension at the end of it.

Personal life
Luis is the elder brother of New York City midfielder Nicolás Acevedo.

Career statistics

Club

References

External links
Profile at Copa Libertadores

1996 births
Living people
Footballers from Montevideo
Association football forwards
Uruguayan footballers
Uruguayan Primera División players
Uruguayan Segunda División players
C.A. Cerro players
Peñarol players
Danubio F.C. players
C.A. Rentistas players
Deportes Temuco footballers
Primera B de Chile players
Expatriate footballers in Chile